The four penny coffin or coffin house was one of the first homeless shelters created for the people of central London. It was operated by the Salvation Army during the late 19th and early 20th centuries to provide comfort and aid to its destitute clients. 

For four pennies, a homeless client could stay at a coffin house. He received food and shelter. Moreover, he was allowed to lie down flat on his back and sleep in a coffin-shaped wooden box. The client was given a tarpaulin for covering. What made this unique is that it was the cheapest homeless shelter in London at that time that allowed its clients to lie down on their back and sleep. The Salvation Army also offered shelters that allowed its clients to sleep on a bed for a much higher price. Hence, the coffin house was popular because it offered an economical and mid-range solution for homeless clients looking for relief from the cold.

Compared with modern examples, this shelter is considered inadequate. It was, however, considered an inexpensive and compassionate attempt to deal with the relatively new problem of homelessness. This shelter provided relief from the harsh London winters and was viewed by many at the time as having the benefit of attracting new followers to Christianity.

References

Homelessness
Victorian era